Jacob Aall Bonnevie Bjerknes (2 November 1897 – 7 July 1975) was a meteorologist. He is known for his key paper in which he pointed the dynamics of the polar front, mechanism for north-south heat transport and for which he was also awarded a doctorate from the University of Oslo.

Born in Stockholm, Sweden, he was the son of  the Norwegian meteorologist Vilhelm Bjerknes, one of the pioneers of modern weather forecasting. He helped develop the Norwegian cyclone model. He earned a Ph.D. from the University of Oslo in 1924. Bjerknes was part of the team that made the first crossing of the Arctic in the airship Norge. During WWII, he helped the US with the planning of the Hiroshima and Nagasaki atomic bombings. He also helped gain an understanding of the weather phenomenon El Niño.

Background
Jacob Aall Bonnevie Bjerknes was born in Stockholm, Sweden. His father was the Norwegian meteorologist Vilhelm Bjerknes, one of the pioneers of modern weather forecasting. His paternal grandfather was Norwegian mathematician and physicist Carl Anton Bjerknes. His maternal grandfather was Norwegian politician Jacob Aall Bonnevie, after whom he was named.

Professional career
Bjerknes was part of a group of meteorologists led by his father, Vilhelm Bjerknes, at the University of Leipzig. Together they developed the model that explains the generation, intensification and ultimate decay (the life cycle) of mid-latitude cyclones, introducing the idea of fronts, that is, sharply defined boundaries between air masses. This concept is known as the Norwegian cyclone model.

Bjerknes returned to Norway in 1917, where his father founded the Geophysical Institute, University of Bergen in Bergen. They organized an analysis and forecasting branch which would evolve into a weather bureau by 1919. The scientific team at Bergen also included the Swedish meteorologists Carl-Gustaf Rossby and Tor Bergeron. As pointed out in a key paper by Jacob Bjerknes and Halvor Solberg (1895-1974) in 1922, the dynamics of the polar front, integrated with the cyclone model, provided the major mechanism for north-south heat transport in the atmosphere. For this and other research, Jacob Bjerknes was awarded the Ph.D. from the University of Oslo in 1924.

In 1926, Jacob Bjerknes was a support meteorologist when Roald Amundsen made the first crossing of the Arctic in the airship Norge. In 1931, he left his position as head of the National weather service at Bergen to become professor of meteorology at the Geophysical Institute at the University of Bergen. Jacob Bjerknes lectured at the Massachusetts Institute of Technology during the 1933-1934 school year and emigrated to the United States in 1940, where he headed a government-sponsored meteorology annex for weather forecasting, at the department of physics of the University of California, Los Angeles. During the Second World War Bjerknes was in the US armed forces, and serving as a colonel in the US Air Force he helped determine the best dates for the atomic bombings of Hiroshima and Nagasaki.

Bjerknes founded the UCLA Department of Meteorology (now the Department of Atmospheric and Oceanic Sciences). As a professor at the University of California, he was the first to see a connection between unusually warm sea-surface temperatures and the weak easterlies and heavy rainfall that accompany . At UCLA, Bjerknes and fellow Norwegian-American meteorologist, Jorgen Holmboe, further developed the pressure tendency and the extratropical cyclone theories.

In 1969, Jacob Bjerknes helped toward an understanding of El Niño Southern Oscillation, by suggesting that an anomalously warm spot in the eastern Pacific can weaken the east-west temperature difference, disrupting trade winds, which push warm water to the west. The result is increasingly warm water toward the east.

Personal life
In 1928, he married Hedvig Borthen (1904–1998). They were the parents of two children. He died on 7 July 1975 in Los Angeles, California.

Honors and awards
He was made an Honorary Member of the Royal Meteorological Society in 1932 and a member of both the Norwegian Academy of Science and Letters and the Royal Swedish Academy of Science in 1933.

Royal Meteorological Society - Symons Gold Medal (1940)
American Geophysical Union - William Bowie Medal (1945)
 Knight 1st Class of the Royal Norwegian Order of St. Olav (1947). 
Swedish Society for Anthropology and Geography - Vega medal (1958)
World Meteorological Organization - International Meteorological Organization Prize (1959).
American Meteorological Society - Carl-Gustaf Rossby Research Medal (1960)
National Medal of Science (1966)
American Academy of Achievement - Golden Plate Award (1967)

References

External links
Biographie de Jacob Bjerknes by Arnt Eliassen
Tribute to J. Bjerknes on the 100th anniversary of his birth
Jacob Bjerknes photograph
National Academy of Sciences Biographical Memoir

1897 births
1975 deaths
National Medal of Science laureates
Norwegian meteorologists
Norwegian climatologists
Carl-Gustaf Rossby Research Medal recipients
Norwegian emigrants to the United States
Members of the Norwegian Academy of Science and Letters
Recipients of the St. Olav's Medal
Jakob
Bonnevie family